Egner is a German surname.  Notable people with the surname include:

Fritz Egner (born 1949), German broadcaster
Marie Egner (1850–1940), Austrian painter
Peter Egner (1922–2011), Holocaust perpetrator
Philip Egner (1870–1956), United States military bandmaster
Thorbjørn Egner (1912–1990), Norwegian playwright, songwriter and illustrator

See also
Eğner, a village in Turkey
Eggner's Ferry Bridge, a bridge in Kentucky
Eggner Trio, a piano trio from Vienna, Austria

German-language surnames